The French Aeronautical Mission to Japan (1918-1919) was the first foreign military mission to Japan since the 1890s. 

In 1918, Japan invited the fourth French Military Mission, composed of 50 members and equipped with several of the newest types of airplanes, to establish the fundamentals of the Japanese airforce (the planes were several Salmson 2A2, Nieuport, Spad XIII, two Breguet XIV, as well as Caquot dirigeables).

The mission, headed by Jacques-Paul Faure, an artillery Colonel, and composed of members of all arms, including about 20 members of the French air services. 

The success of the mission prompted the Japanese Navy to invite the Sempill Mission from Britain.

References
"Sabre et pinceau", Christian Polak.

Military history of Japan
France–Japan military relations
1918 in France
1919 in France
Military history of France
1918 in Japan
1919 in Japan
1919 in international relations
1918 in international relations
1918 in military history
1919 in military history